Tha Block Is Hot is the debut major label studio album by American rapper Lil Wayne. It was released on November 2, 1999, by Universal Records and Baby's Cash Money Records. Recording sessions took place from 1997 to 1999, with the executive production from Bryan "Baby" Williams and Ronald "Slim" Williams, all of these tracks were produced by Mannie Fresh himself. Prior to release, the album was known by the title I Ride At Night.

Commercial performance 
Tha Block Is Hot debuted at number three on the US Billboard 200 chart, selling 229,500 copies in its first week. In its second week, the album dropped to number ten on the chart, selling an additional 117,000 copies. On December 10, 1999, the album became certified Platinum by the Recording Industry Association of America (RIAA) for sales of over a million copies. As of June 2012, the album has sold 1.4 million copies in the United States.

Track listing 

Samples credits
 "Loud Pipes" contains a sample of "Rich Niggaz" performed by Juvenile.

Charts

Weekly charts

Year-end charts

Certifications

References

1999 debut albums
Lil Wayne albums
Albums produced by Mannie Fresh
Bounce music albums
Cash Money Records albums